Great Han (大漢) may refer to:

Chen Han Kingdom
Greater Han, a school of thought relating to Chinese culture
Official name of the Southern Han dynasty from 918 to 970. 
Great Han Empire, a name for the Han dynasty 
A state declared during the Nian Rebellion
Great Han Sichuan Military Government, a regional government established during the 1911 Revolution by Pu Dianzun (蒲殿俊) in Sichuan
Name of the Korean Empire (大韓)